William James Timpson  (born 17 September 1971) is a British businessman and philanthropist. He has been CEO of Timpson Group, owned by his father, John Timpson, since 2002.

Timpson attended Uppingham School. He completed a degree in Geography at Durham University before joining the family business.

Known for advocating the employment of former prisoners, he has been Chair of the Prison Reform Trust since 2016. In March 2021, he was reappointed by the Prime Minister as Trustee of the Tate for a four year period. He replaced Jonathon Porritt as Chancellor of Keele University in June 2022.

References

Living people
1971 births
British chief executives
Chancellors of Keele University
Alumni of Hatfield College, Durham